Cyanoacetic acid is an organic compound. It is a white, hygroscopic solid.  The compound contains two functional groups, a nitrile (−C≡N) and a carboxylic acid.  It is a precursor to cyanoacrylates, components of adhesives.

Preparation and reactions
Cyanoacetic acid is prepared by treatment of chloroacetate salts with sodium cyanide followed by acidification. Electrosynthesis by cathodic reduction of carbon dioxide and anodic oxidation of acetonitrile also affords cyanoacetic acid.

Cyanoacetic acid is used to do cyanoacetylation, first convenient method described by J. Slätt.

It is about 1000x more acidic than acetic acid, with a pKa of 2.5.  Upon heating at 160 °C, it undergoes decarboxylation to give acetonitrile:
 C3H3NO2   →   C2H3N +  CO2

Applications
The largest scale reaction is its esterification to give the corresponding ester ethyl cyanoacetate, which is then transformed to ethyl cyanoacrylate used as superglue, via reaction with formaldehyde. As of 2007, more than 10,000 tons of cyanoacetic acid were produced annually.

Cyanoacetic acid is a versatile intermediate in the preparation of chemicals.  it is a precursor to synthetic caffeine via the intermediacy of theophylline.  It is a building block for many drugs, including dextromethorphan, amiloride, sulfadimethoxine, and allopurinol, and also for Peldesine.

Safety
The LD50 (oral, rats) is 1.5 g/kg.

References

Nitriles
Carboxylic acids